Feng Sheng (also Fengsheng or Feng-sheng) can refer to:

Art
Feng Sheng, a character in The Female Prince
Feng Sheng Music, a Chinese record label used by Wang Feng (singer)
The Message (novel) (Chinese: 风声; pinyin: Feng Sheng, translated "Sound of the Wind"), a 2007 novel by Mai Jia
The Message (2009 film), a film based on Mai Jia's 2007 novel
Fengsheng Style (奉聖樂), a Chinese musical style
Fengsheng Shuiqi (风生水起), 1997 Chinese television program starring Li Bingbing

Business
Fengsheng Motors, a Dongfeng Motors subsidiary

People
Huang Feng-sheng, a member of Chinese Taipei men's national volleyball team
Liu Fengsheng (劉豐生), (died 548), Chinese major general who died in a siege of Xuchang, Henan
Feng Sheng (general), a Ming dynasty general

See also
Fengcheng (disambiguation)
Fengshen (disambiguation)